Tales of Kish (and also known as Kish Tales) is a 1999 Iranian drama anthology film. It was entered into the 1999 Cannes Film Festival.

Cast
 Hossein Panahi as Shanbeh (segment "Greek Boat, The")
 Atefeh Razavi as Wife (segment "Greek Boat, The")
 Hafez Pakdel as (segment "Ring, The")
 Mohamad A. Babhan as Man (segment "Door, The")
 Norieh Mahigiran as Daughter (segment "Door, The")

References

External links
 

1999 films
Iranian drama films
1990s Persian-language films
1999 drama films
Films directed by Abolfazl Jalili
Films directed by Mohsen Makhmalbaf
Films directed by Nasser Taghvai